Ronald Weenas (born 25 July 1968) is a Norwegian former football player, most notably for Molde FK.

Playing career
Wenaas started his senior career at Rival and became a Molde player in 1987. On 16 May 1988, he made his debut for the club as a substitute for Torbjørn Evensen in Molde's 4–1 win away from home against Brann. On 24 July 1988, he scored his first goal in Molde's 6–2 win at home against Bryne. He was in the starting lineups in both finals of the 1989 Norwegian Cup where Molde drew 2–2 against Viking in the first final and lost 1–2 in the replay.

Wenaas was transferred to Kristiansund FK in 1991 and moved on to Strindheim after one season in Kristiansund. He returned to Molde in 1995, where he stayed for four seasons. He played a total of 81 league matches and scored 6 goals during his 8 years in Molde. He ended his career with a second spell at Strindheim, which lasted from 1998 till the end of the 2001 season.

Coaching career
In 2002, Wenaas became head coach at Strindheim  where he stayed until 2008.

References

External links

1968 births
Living people
People from Molde
Norwegian footballers
Molde FK players
Strindheim IL players
Eliteserien players
Norwegian First Division players
Association football midfielders
Norwegian football managers
Sportspeople from Møre og Romsdal